Karfiguéla is a village in Burkina Faso's Comoé Province. It has around 890 inhabitants and is home to the Cascades de Karfiguéla, a major tourism destination in Burkina Faso. The town is located about 12 km northwest of Banfora, the provincial capital and the farmers who live there mostly harvest sugar cane.

References

Comoé Province
Populated places in the Cascades Region